Narusa  is a village in the administrative district of Gmina Frombork, within Braniewo County, Warmian-Masurian Voivodeship, in northern Poland.

The village has a population of 95.

References

Narusa